Ranunculus longirostris, the longbeak buttercup, is an aquatic plant in the buttercup family.

This species is native to Canada and the United States, where it is widespread. However, it is absent from most of the Southeastern United States. It is found in a diversity of freshwater aquatic habitats, often in streams with slow moving water.

There has been some difficulty in separating this species from the closely related Ranunculus trichophyllus, due in part to the lack of preservation of critical features on herbarium specimens.

References

External links
Description from USGS

longirostris
Flora of North America